Alnwick was a local government district of Northumberland, England. Its council was based in the town of Alnwick and the district had a population of 31,029 according to the 2001 census.

It was one of the most rural and sparsely populated districts in the United Kingdom, having a resident population of 32,300 in an area of 1,079.51 square kilometres, according to the 2001 census. (That is 29 persons per km² compared with the UK average of 245 persons per km².) Just over 50% of the population was located in the three main towns of Alnwick (7,600), Amble (6,100) and Rothbury (2,500), with the remainder dispersed across large and small villages, hamlets and isolated dwellings.

It was the second most racially homogeneous community in the country, in the terms measured in the 2001 census with 99.6% of the population recording their ethnicity as White.

The district was formed on 1 April 1974 as a merger of the urban districts of Alnwick and Amble and the rural districts of Alnwick and Rothbury. The district was abolished as part of structural changes to local government in England effective from 1 April 2009. Its responsibilities were transferred to Northumberland County Council, which became a unitary authority.

Politics

Elections to the district council were held every 4 years from 1973 to the last election in 2007. Independents, Conservatives and Liberal Democrats held majorities on the council at different times, but from 1995 onwards no party had a majority. As of the last election in 2007 the council was composed of the following councillors:-

Main towns

Alnwick 
Alnwick was the largest of the three main towns in the district. It is a reasonably busy rural market town. According to Country Life, October 2002, "Alnwick is the most picturesque market town in Northumberland, and the best place to live in Britain". The town dates back approximately to the 7th century, and is the ancestral seat of the Duke of Northumberland, who still resides at Alnwick Castle. Historically, Alnwick was a fortified town, an agricultural centre and a staging post on the Great North Road between Edinburgh and London. The fabric of the town, in parts, reflects its history, although there has been much contemporary development.

Amble 
The historic port of Amble is located on the River Coquet estuary and is the southern gateway to Northumberland's Heritage Coast.

Rothbury 
Rothbury is a picturesque historic market town with its origins dating back to the 11th century. It is situated on the River Coquet, and provides a gateway to Upper Coquetdale and the Northumberland National Park.

References

External links 
 Alnwick District Council
 Alnwick Castle
 Alnwick Garden
 Statistics about the Alnwick district from the Office for National Statistics Census 2001

Alnwick (district)
Alnwick
English districts abolished in 2009
Former non-metropolitan districts of Northumberland